This is an alphabetical list of cricketers who played for Lancashire Thunder during their existence between 2016 and 2019. They competed in the Women's Cricket Super League, a Twenty20 competition, during these years before being replaced by North West Thunder as part of a restructure of English women's domestic cricket.

Players' names are followed by the years in which they were active as a Lancashire Thunder player. Seasons given are first and last seasons; the player did not necessarily play in all the intervening seasons. This list only includes players who appeared in at least one match for Lancashire Thunder; players who were named in the team's squad for a season but did not play a match are not included.

B
 Nicole Bolton (2018)
 Georgie Boyce (2018–2019)
 Natalie Brown (2016–2019)

C
 Kate Cross (2016–2019)

D
 Rachel Dickinson (2017)
 Deandra Dottin (2016)
 Sophia Dunkley (2019)
 Alice Dyson (2019)

E
 Sophie Ecclestone (2016–2019)

F
 Ria Fackrell (2019)

H
 Alex Hartley (2018–2019)
 Danielle Hazell (2017–2018)

J
 Jess Jonassen (2017)
 Evelyn Jones (2017–2019)

K
 Harmanpreet Kaur (2018–2019)

L
 Emma Lamb (2017–2019)
 Suné Luus (2019)

M
 Tahlia McGrath (2019)
 Laura Marshall (2016)
 Hayley Matthews (2016)
 Natasha Miles (2016–2017)

N
 Laura Newton (2016)

P
 Nalisha Patel (2016)

S
 Amy Satterthwaite (2016–2018)

T
 Lea Tahuhu (2017)
 Sarah Taylor (2017)
 Eleanor Threlkeld (2016–2019)

W 
 Danni Wyatt (2016)

Captains

See also
 List of North West Thunder cricketers

References

Lancashire Thunder